In mathematics, the Möbius energy of a knot is a particular knot energy, i.e., a functional on the space of knots.  It was discovered by Jun O'Hara, who demonstrated that the energy blows up as the knot's strands get close to one another.  This is a useful property because it prevents self-intersection and ensures the result under gradient descent is of the same knot type.

Invariance of Möbius energy under Möbius transformations was demonstrated by Michael Freedman, Zheng-Xu He, and Zhenghan Wang (1994) who used it to show the existence of a  energy minimizer in each isotopy class of a prime knot.  They also showed the minimum energy of any knot conformation is achieved by a round circle.

Conjecturally, there is no energy minimizer for composite knots. Robert B. Kusner and John M. Sullivan have done computer experiments with a discretized version of the Möbius energy and concluded that there should be no energy minimizer for the knot sum of two trefoils (although this is not a proof).

Recall that the Möbius  transformations of the 3-sphere 
 are the ten-dimensional group of angle-preserving diffeomorphisms generated by inversion in 2-spheres. For example, the inversion in the sphere  is defined by 

Consider a rectifiable simple curve  in the Euclidean 
Define its energy by

where  is the shortest arc 
distance between 
The second term of the 
integrand is called a
regularization. It is easy to see that  is
In fact, let us use the arc-length parameterization. Denote by  the length of the curve . Then

Let  denote a unit circle. We have

and consequently,
 

since .

Knot invariant

A knot is created by beginning with a one-dimensional line segment, wrapping it around itself arbitrarily, and then fusing its two free ends together to form a closed loop. Topologists consider knots and other entanglements such as links and braids to be equivalent if the knot can be pushed about smoothly, without intersecting itself, to coincide with another knot. The idea of knot equivalence is to give a precise definition of when two knots should be considered the same even when positioned quite differently in space.

The basic problem of knot theory, the recognition problem, is determining the equivalence of two knots.  Algorithms exist to solve this problem, with the first given by Wolfgang Haken in the late 1960s. Nonetheless, these algorithms can be extremely time-consuming, and a major issue in the theory is to understand how hard this problem really is. The special case of recognizing the unknot, called the unknotting problem, is of particular interest.
We shall picture a knot by a smooth curve rather than by a polygon. A knot will be represented by a planar diagram. The singularities of the planar diagram will be called crossing points and the regions into which it subdivides the plane regions of  the diagram. At each crossing point, two of the four corners will be  dotted to indicate which branch through the crossing point is to be thought of as one passing under the other. We number any one region at random, but shall fix the numbers of all remaining regions such that whenever we cross the curve from right to left we must pass from region number  to the region number . The crossing points are distinguished by two types: the right handed and the left handed, according to which branch through the point passes under or behind the other. We wish to distinguish one type of knot from another by knot invariants. There is one invariant which is quite simple. It is Alexander polynomial  with integer coefficient. The Alexander polynomial is symmetric with degree :  for all knots  of   crossing points.

Let
We have

does not change, if we change the knot  in its equivalence class.

Möbius Invariance Property  
If  is contained in  then . If  passes through  then .

Theorem A. Among all rectifiable loops , round circles have the least energy  and any  of least energy parameterizes a round circle.

The energy  with equality holding if and only if  is a straight line. Apply the Möbius invariance property we complete the proof.

Proof of Möbius Invariance Property. It is sufficient to consider how , an inversion in a sphere, transforms energy. Let  be the arc length parameter of a rectifiable closed curve , . Let

and

It is a short calculation (using the law of cosines) that the first terms transform correctly, i.e.,

where  and

and

Since  is uniformly bounded, we have

Similarly,

Then by 

hence, .

In this case  and, thus, the constant term 4 in  disappears.

Freedman–He–Wang conjecture
This was proved in 2012 by Ian Agol, Fernando C. Marques and André Neves, by using Almgren–Pitts min-max theory. The  Möbius cross energy of the link  is defined to be

It is not difficult to check that . If two circles are very far from each other, the cross energy can be made arbitrarily small.  
If the linking number   is non-zero, the link is called non-split and for the non-split link, . So we are interested in the minimal energy of non-split links.
Note that the definition of the energy   extends 
This property is explained as follows. Let   denote a conformal map. Then  This condition  is called the conformal invariance property of the Möbius cross energy.

Main Theorem.  Let ,   be a non-split link  of 2 components  link.  Then . 

Given two non-intersecting differentiable curves , define the Gauss map  from the torus to the sphere by

We have

	

Thus,

It follows that for almost every ,
 

If the link  is contained in an oriented affine hyperplane with unit normal vector  compatible with the orientation, then

References
 
 
 

Footnotes

Knot theory